Rave is a 2000 American drama film written and directed by Ronald Krauss and starring Douglas Spain, Aimee Graham, Nicholle Tom, Tamara Mello, and Efren Ramirez.

Premise
On a Saturday night in downtown Los Angeles, several teenagers converge at a rave. The teens range from Daffy, an upstanding Mexican-American from a good home; Jay Hoon, a Korean-American teen who defies his strict father to go to the rave; JP and his friend Lazy; and rich girl trio Sadie, Mary, and Tracy. In one day, we see a portrait of these teenagers finding their way through all the temptations, attractions and dangers of the wild underbelly of Los Angeles.

Cast

Reception 
Dennis Harvey of Variety gave the film a negative review, citing its clichéd, by-the-numbers plotlines. He wrote, "No more imaginative than its title, indie feature exploits a rave as colorful background for retrograde troubled-youth dramatics that pile on one alarmist cliche — drug O.D., drive-by shooting, Parents Who Don’t Love Enough, etc. — after another to absolutely no credible effect." Harvey concluded "Most real-life teens, not to mention ravers, will find Rave absurdly condescending and exploitative."

Marc Savlov of The Austin Chronicle wrote, "The acting and technique (not to mention a rousing credit sequence) are uniformly good, but viewers familiar with the rave scene may come away feeling as if they've just been hit over the head with an American Family Association two-by-four. Peace, love, unity, and respect may be the bywords of rave culture, but Krauss' film plays more like a dreary ABC After-School Special in which common teenage quandaries result in death or worse, and your friendly neighborhood E dealer is a psycho killer."

See also  
 Groove, a film about rave culture released in the same year

References

External links

2000 films
2000 drama films
2000 independent films
American drama films
American LGBT-related films
American teen drama films
2000s teen drama films
Films set in Los Angeles
2000s English-language films
2000s American films